Bukit Merah Interchange may refer to:
Bukit Merah Interchange, Malaysia
Bukit Merah Bus Interchange, Singapore